Gumrah is a 1963 Hindi-language romantic drama film produced and directed by B. R. Chopra. The film stars Sunil Dutt, Ashok Kumar, Mala Sinha, Nirupa Roy, Deven Verma and Shashikala. The music was composed by Ravi and the lyrics were by Sahir Ludhianvi. The film was a box office success. It was remade in Malayalam as Vivahitha (1970). For her performance, Shashikala won the Filmfare Award for Best Supporting Actress.

Plot 
Meena and Kamla are two daughters of a wealthy Nainital resident. While Kamla lives with her established attorney husband, Ashok, in Mumbai, Meena is in love with artist-singer Rajendra. When Kamla comes to Nainital for her delivery, she becomes aware of Meena's affair and plans to get her married to Rajendra. Ashok however, is totally unaware of this fact.

Before Kamla can do this, she dies after falling off a cliff near her father's home. Afraid that her sister's children will be ill-treated by a stepmother, Meena is compelled to marry Ashok. Ashok does not know about her love affair with Rajendra. For a while things go well, until she meets Rajendra again. He follows her to Mumbai, and they begin meeting secretly.

One day, Meena is caught by Leela, a woman who claims to be Rajendra's wife and who proceeds to blackmail her. Meena's life comes to a crisis, and she is forced to make a choice between Rajendra and Ashok.

Later Meena realizes that Leela is not Rajendra's wife and she attempts to kill her in anger but her husband Ashok stopped her. Ashok tells Meena that Leela is her secretary and he told his secretary to do that. Ashok tells Meena that she can go with Rajendra. Rajendra comes to Ashok's home but Meena tells him that there is no Meena but only Mrs. Ashok and she tells him to forget her. Then she apologizes to Ashok and Ashok forgives her. The film ends with the message "And they lived happily thereafter".

The movie examines the conflict of a married woman who is caught between her feelings for her lover and her duty to her husband and family. A bold theme for the times (1963), the same conflict is examined again in several south Indian films like Abhinandana (1988) and also the 2005 Akshay Kumar-starrer Bewafaa.

Cast 
 Ashok Kumar as Ashok
 Sunil Dutt  as Rajendra
 Mala Sinha as Meena
 Nirupa Roy as Kamla
 Shashikala as Leela
 Deven Verma as Pyarelal
 Nana Palsikar as Meena's Father

Soundtrack

Awards 

|-
| rowspan="4"|1963
| B. R. Chopra
| Certificate of Merit for Third Best Hindi Feature Film
| 
|-
| Shashikala
| Filmfare Award for Best Supporting Actress
| 
|-
| Mahendra Kapoor
| Filmfare Award for Best Male Playback Singer
| 
|-
| Pran Mehra
| Filmfare Award for Best Editing
| 
|}

References

External links 
 

1963 films
1960s Hindi-language films
Films directed by B. R. Chopra
Films scored by Ravi
Hindi films remade in other languages